The subfamily Bruchomyiinae contains genera of moth flies in the order Diptera, was originally described by the American entomologist Charles Paul Alexander.

Circumscription
For many years the Bruchomyiinae consisted of just three genera, distinguished by the number of segments in the antennae: Bruchomyia (24-29 segments), Eutonnoiria  (111 segments) and Nemopalpus (14 segments).  A number of species of the cosmopolitan genus Nemopalpus were transferred in 2016, to the genera: Boreofairchildia, Laurenceomyia and Notofairchildia, with oriental species subsequently (2018) placed in Alexanderia.

Genera
Systema Dipterorum currently includes:
Alexanderia Wagner & Kvifte, 2018 (Oriental)
Boreofairchildia Wagner & Stuckenberg, 2016 (Americas)
Bruchomyia Alexander, 1921 (South America):
Eutonnoiria Alexander, 1940 (Central Africa)
Laurenceomyia Wagner & Stuckenberg, 2016 (South America)
Nemopalpus Macquart, 1838
Notofairchildia Wagner & Stuckenberg, 2016
†Hoffeinsodes Wagner, 2017 Baltic amber, Eocene
†Palaeoglaesum Wagner, 2017

References

External Links
 

Diptera subfamilies
Psychodidae
Taxa named by Charles Paul Alexander